Lostock Hall Gatehouse is an Elizabethan building located in Lostock, a western suburb of Bolton in Greater Manchester, England.

The now demolished Lostock Hall, built as a manor house for the Anderton family, was a half-timbered building with four overhanging gables. Over the entrance door were the initials CAD, representing for Christopher Anderton and his wife Dorothy, and the date 1563. Most of the rooms were wainscoted with many panels. In the 18th and early 19th centuries, the hall was used as a farmhouse. In 1816, part of the hall was pulled down, and the remainder was demolished in 1824.

The gatehouse, a Grade II* listed building, is all that now remains of the hall. The main front is of ashlar and the other three sides are covered with thin coursed rubble. The central arch was originally open, which a man could ride through, is now built up with a doorway. Originally there were no windows on the ground floor, but two sash windows have been introduced between the Tuscan columns, one on each side of the door. The upper floor windows are flanked by pairs of widely spaced Ionic and Corinthian columns. Above the first-floor window is a square panel with the Anderton coat of arms, and above the second-floor window is a shield bearing the royal arms of Queen Elizabeth I with the date 1591 and the royal initials E.R. For many years the gatehouse was also used as a farmhouse, but today is a private residence.

See also 

Grade II* listed buildings in Greater Manchester
Listed buildings in Bolton
Anderton baronets
Anderton family

References

Buildings and structures in Bolton
Grade II* listed buildings in Greater Manchester
Gatehouses (architecture)
Buildings and structures demolished in 1824
Demolished buildings and structures in England